Milan Kerbr (born 9 June 1967 in Uherské Hradiště) is a Czech former professional football player. He played two matches for the Czech Republic as a substitute on both occasions.

He was a part of the Czech Republic for the UEFA Euro 1996.

References

External links
 

Living people
1967 births
People from Uherské Hradiště
Association football forwards
Czechoslovak footballers
Czech footballers
Czech expatriate footballers
UEFA Euro 1996 players
Czech Republic international footballers
SK Sigma Olomouc players
FC Fastav Zlín players
SpVgg Greuther Fürth players
SSV Reutlingen 05 players
Czech First League players
2. Bundesliga players
Expatriate footballers in Germany
Sportspeople from the Zlín Region